Calixte F. Savoie (August 23, 1895 – December 2, 1985) was a Canadian businessman, school principal, teacher and politician.

Born in Bouctouche, New Brunswick, he was summoned to the Senate of Canada in 1955. An Independent Liberal, he represented the senatorial division of L'Acadie, New Brunswick. He resigned in 1970.

École Calixte-F.-Savoie in Sainte-Anne-de-Kent, New Brunswick is named in his honour.

External links
 

1895 births
1985 deaths
Acadian people
Canadian senators from New Brunswick
Independent Canadian senators